Pierre-William Glenn (born 31 October 1943) is a French cinematographer and director. He contributed to more than seventy films since 1968 including Day for Night and Street of No Return.

References

External links 

1943 births
Living people
French cinematographers